James William Mathieson (21 June 1931 – 12 April 2003) was a sculptor from the United Kingdom.

Mathieson was born in Calcutta, India, but moved with his family to Scotland in 1947. As a young adult, he completed national service, then worked in insurance while completing his school studies (O- and A-levels) at evening classes. He joined the Campaign for Nuclear Disarmament in 1960, becoming an active member.

In 1964, at the age of 34, he started a four-year art course at City and Guilds of London Art School in London. Following this, between 1969 and 1979, he taught part-time at the Sir John Cass and Ealing schools of art, teaching aspects of sculpture. From 1979, he worked full-time as a sculptor. His best-known sculpture is of the artist William Hogarth and his pug dog Trump, which stands on Chiswick High Road, London. This was unveiled by Ian Hislop and David Hockney in October 2001.

Mathieson was married twice, to Edna Skinner in 1959, and to Judy Craig in 1981, and has one surviving daughter.

External links
Gallery of Mathieson's sculptures
Obituary

1931 births
2003 deaths
Campaign for Nuclear Disarmament activists
Scottish sculptors
Scottish male sculptors
20th-century British sculptors
Alumni of the City and Guilds of London Art School